Circumcision surgical procedure in males involves either a conventional "cut and stitch" surgical procedure or use of a circumcision instrument or device. In the newborn period (less than 2 months of age), almost all circumcisions are done by generalist physicians using one of three surgical instruments. In the US, the Gomco clamp is the most utilized instrument, followed by the Mogen clamp and the Plastibell. They are also used worldwide.

Complications may include bleeding, infection, reduction in sensation of the glans penis, and too little or too much tissue removal. Deaths are rare. After the newborn period, circumcision has a higher risk of complications, especially bleeding and anesthetic complications.

In the 21st century, most circumcisions in boys and men are performed using one of three open surgical methods. The forceps-guided method, the dorsal slit method, and the sleeve resection method are well described by the World Health Organization in their Manual for Male Circumcision under Local Anaesthesia. The Gomco clamp and Mogen clamp are sometimes used after the newborn period, in conjunction with either surgical sutures or cyanoacrylate tissue adhesive to prevent post-operative bleeding.

Circumcision surgical instruments should be distinguished from circumcision devices. Circumcision instruments are used at the time of surgery, and the circumcision is complete at the end of the procedure. The Gomco clamp, the Mogen clamp, and Unicirc are surgical instruments. Circumcision devices remain on the penis for 4 to 7 days and either spontaneously detach or are removed surgically at a subsequent visit. Plastibell, Shang Ring, and other plastic rings are all circumcision devices, also known as "in situ" devices. Circumcision via instrument results in healing by primary intention and healing via devices is by secondary intention, so healing is delayed. All circumcision procedures should involve adequate injectable or topical anesthesia.

Circumcision surgical instruments

Gomco clamp

The Gomco clamp is a surgical instrument used to perform circumcision in all age groups, but is mainly used in newborn circumcision. It is the leading instrument for newborn circumcision in the US. The World Health Organization describes it as having "an impeccable safety record".

After retracting the foreskin, the Gomco bell is placed over the glans at the level of the corona and the foreskin is replaced into the anatomic (natural) position. The yoke is then placed over the bell, trapping the foreskin between the bell and the yoke. The clamp is tightened, crushing the foreskin between the bell and the base plate, and left in place for 5 minutes. The crushed blood vessels provide hemostasis. The flared bottom of the bell fits tightly against the hole of the base plate, so the foreskin may be cut away with a scalpel from above the base plate, the intent being a lower risk of injuring the glans.

Advantages
Circumcision is rapid and completed in a single session. The total procedure takes less than ten minutes, five minutes of which is spent in waiting for the crushing action to take place. In newborns (<2 months of age), no sutures are needed and bleeding is uncommon. After the newborn period, either sutures or cyanoacrylate tissue adhesive can be used to seal the fused mucosal-skin edge to prevent post-operative bleeding. Because the glans is protected by the bell of the Gomco clamp, injuries to the glans are rare. No parts are left on the penis, so late complications are rare compared to devices like the Plastibell which remain on the penis.

Complications
Care must be taken to ensure that the device is properly sterilized between procedures, or transmission of infection may occur. The American Academy of Pediatrics reviewed one study of 1,000 newborn Gomco circumcisions in a hospital setting in Saudi Arabia and rated it "fair evidence". The study found an overall complication rate of 1.9%. Bleeding occurred in 0.6% of cases, infection in 0.4%, and insufficient foreskin removed in 0.3%.

Because the Gomco clamp is made of three major parts, there is a chance that pieces could be incorrectly assembled from differently-sized units or those produced by different manufacturers. Using mismatched parts results in a device that might not sufficiently crush the foreskin, potentially resulting in bleeding.

History
The Gomco clamp was invented by Dr. Hiram S. Yellen and Aaron A. Goldstein in 1935. Yellen, an obstetrician-gynecologist in Buffalo, New York, sought an improved method of newborn circumcision. Goldstein was a prolific local inventor and manufacturer. Gomco stands for the GOldstein Medical COmpany, the original manufacturer of the instrument. The patent was in the name of Aaron Goldstein (U.S. Patent 119180, issued February 27, 1940). The instrument was a rapid success and was widely marketed and sold in the US and Canada. It is currently manufactured and marketed worldwide.

Prevalence
Multiple surveys in the US estimate that the rate of male circumcision ranges 42–80% among various populations. The Gomco clamp is the leading instrument used to perform non-ritual male circumcision in the United States. There is little information concerning prevalence of Gomco use outside of the US. A 1998 survey found that the Gomco clamp was the preferred technique by 67% of American physicians, whereas Plastibell was used by 19% and the Mogen clamp by 10%.

Mogen clamp
The Mogen clamp is a surgical instrument which permits rapid circumcision. It is most often used in the newborn period, particularly for Jewish ceremonial circumcision (Bris), but is also used in older boys. The newborn version has two flat blades that open 2.5 mm. The Mogen clamp is widely used around the world.

The foreskin is first extended using several straight hemostats. The Mogen clamp is then slid over the foreskin. After confirming that the tip of the glans is free of the blades, the clamp is locked, and a scalpel is used to cut the skin from the flat (upper) side of the clamp. In newborns, no sutures are required. Outside of the newborn period, cyanoacrylate tissue adhesive can be used instead of sutures.

Advantages
The Mogen clamp has no parts to assemble, is easy to use, and results in a bloodless circumcision with minimal scarring.  A single size can be used for infants, obviating any sizing errors. It is rapid, but requires five minutes of clamping to prevent post-operative bleeding. Any complications are immediate, because the instrument is not left on the penis, so they can be dealt with on site. The clamp can be safely used by non-physician healthcare workers in resource-limited settings.

Complications
Care must be taken to ensure that the device is properly sterilized between procedures, or transmission of infection may occur. The instrument does not directly protect the glans during the procedure, so there is a risk that the glans can be pulled into the slit and crushed or partially severed.

In July 2010, one company manufacturing Mogen clamps (Mogen Circumcision Instruments of New York) went out of business following a lawsuit in which the doctor entirely removed the head of the penis from the child.  The court awarded the plaintiff $10 million in damages. This came following similar lawsuits in 2007 and 2009, which awarded $7.5 million and $2.3 million, respectively.
According to the American Academy of Pediatrics, there are no good studies of complications of the Mogen clamp because complications are rare; thus, one can only rely on available case reports of glans injuries.

History
The word mogen is derived from the Hebrew word for "shield". The Mogen clamp was introduced by Dr. Harry Bronstein in 1955.  Before the advent of the Mogen clamp, the Jewish shield was used, which has a narrow gap that protected the glans while the foreskin was pulled through and excised. Others modified this shield and began using instruments that produced a crushing action. Still used in many parts of the world, bone cutters are used to shield the glans, crush the foreskin tissue and guide the scalpel for a clean incision. The Mogen clamp is a refinement of these ancient techniques.

Other instruments
The Winkelmann clamp is a sterilizable Gomco-like instrument which consists of a single unit, so mismatching of parts cannot occur.
Unicirc is a disposable plastic and metal instrument which functions similarly to the Gomco clamp, and, according to WHO, has "nearly met the clinical evaluation study requirements described in the WHO Framework for the Clinical Evaluation of Devices."

Research
A meta-analysis of randomized controlled trials suggested that compressive instruments were associated with less blood loss, more rapid healing, and less pain compared to other techniques.

Circumcision "in situ" devices
All "in situ" devices are based upon steel circumcision rings originally patented by Cecil Ross in 1939. Plastibell represents the first commercialization of the Ross device and is the progenitor of all subsequent "in situ" devices. Such devices consist of a plastic ring which is inserted beneath the foreskin at the level of the corona and has a ligature, or ligature device, which acts as a tourniquet. This necroses the remaining part of the foreskin and the device either detaches spontaneously after 4 to 7 days, or is removed surgically at one week. Initial implementation of "in situ" devices for HIV prevention has failed to demonstrate potential advantages with regard to efficiency or cost, compared to conventional surgical circumcision.

Plastibell

Plastibell is a single-use disposable plastic device mainly used to circumcise infants which may be used for boys up to 12 years of age.
The Plastibell plastic ring is placed under the foreskin and secured with a circumferential ligature, which prevents bleeding when the distal foreskin is excised.  The entire procedure takes five to ten minutes. The ring falls off after 4 to 7 days, leaving a circumferential wound that heals by secondary intention in one to two weeks.

Advantages
Plastibell is a single-use-only disposable device, which prevents reuse and potential transmission of infection. The glans is protected during the procedure by the ring, so there is a reduced risk of injury to the glans, compared to the Mogen clamp. It is a rapid procedure which can be done under clean (rather than sterile) conditions. No bandage is required, allowing for easy monitoring for bleeding or infection.

Complications
The American Academy of Pediatrics estimates that overall complications occur in 2.4–5% of Plastibell procedures. The risk of bleeding is 1%, similar to the risk with the Gomco clamp and Mogen clamp. A significant complication can occur if the glans swells and herniates (protrudes) through the ring. This worsens the swelling and can reduce blood
and urine flow, resulting in serious long-term sequelae. Unlike complications occurring with surgical instruments that are dealt with immediately, this complication occurs hours to days after the patient leaves the clinic and must be dealt with promptly to prevent serious complications. Therefore, Plastibell should only be used when follow-up is rapidly available.

History
The idea of using a tourniquet approach to infant circumcision is attributed to Cecil J. Ross, who patented steel circumcision rings in 1939. Subsequently, Kariher patented a plastic ring with a removable handle in 1955. The Plastibell comes in a sterile package with a single ligature.

Shang ring
The Shang Ring is a disposable plastic "in situ" device for male circumcision. It has been studied in China and Africa, and has been approved by WHO for circumcision in males > 13 years of age to prevent HIV. The Shang Ring consists of two concentric medical grade plastic rings: an inner ring with a silicone band and an outer, hinged ring that acts as a ligature. The appropriate size is determined through use of a measuring strip. The inner ring is placed underneath the foreskin. The outer (hinged) ring is placed on the outside of the foreskin and locks against the inner ring when snapped together. The distal foreskin is then excised. The Shang Ring is removed after one week when the outer ring locking mechanism is opened using a special tool. A pair of scissors, specifically designed for this purpose, is then used to remove the inner ring.

Advantages
Shang Ring is marketed as being simple, disposable, easy to use, and provides sutureless circumcision that may be an acceptable alternative to current surgical techniques.

Complications
Like other "in situ" devices, complications may occur up to several days following the placement procedure and must be dealt with promptly to prevent serious sequelae. Shang Ring should only be used where surgical care is rapidly available. In a review by WHO personnel, 0.4% men required rapid intervention with surgical circumcision as the excision had occurred but the foreskin slipped from the device and required suturing. No serious adverse events occurred; 1% experienced moderate adverse events from a total of 1983 successful device placements. All adverse events were managed with minor interventions and resolved without long-term sequelae. Rates were similar to those observed with conventional surgical circumcision.

In settings where skilled surgeons are mostly located in urban centers, referral of clients who require surgical management of device-related complications within the recommended time frame of 6–12 hours may not be possible. Healing is by secondary intention and is therefore delayed compared to techniques which allow for healing by primary intention. There is a risk of HIV transmission if men engage in unprotected sex before the wound is healed. Thus, Shang Ring circumcision requires a longer period of post-circumcision sexual abstinence than surgical or instrumental methods.

History
The Shang Ring was developed by Jianzhong Shang in 2003. The Shang Ring has been approved by WHO, and is cleared by the U.S. FDA under the 510(k) mechanism with Plastibell as the predicate device.

Shang ring is being used in HIV prevention programs in the 15 countries in sub-Saharan Africa where HIV is most common.

Other plastic ring devices
"Prepex" was withdrawn from the market in 2019. Many other plastic ring devices exist, none of which has thus far gained significant market share. "Circumplast" is a Plastibell-like device which uses a cylinder instead of a ring, which aids in more easily placing the ligature and prevents damage to the glans. "Tara Klamp", "SmartKlamp", and "Ali's Klamp" are all in situ ring devices for boys and men.

References

Further reading 
 
 Update: Voluntary Medical Male Circumcision. UNAIDS. 2016.

External links 
 Infant Circumcision: Gomco Technique (Video)
 Adult circumcision with Gomco and tissue adhesive to prevent HIV (Video)
 Infant Circumcision: Mogen Technique (Video)
 Mogen older child circumcision (Video)
 Unicirc (Video)
 Gomco and Plastibell (Video)
 Prepex (Video)
 Shang Ring (Video)

Circumcision
Surgical instruments